Island Bay United is a football club in the southern suburb of Island Bay in Wellington, New Zealand. The club was founded in 1931 as Wellington Technical College Old Boys. In 1966 the name was changed to Island Bay United. Island Bay United currently play in the Capital Premier League run by Capital Football.

The club also competes in the Chatham Cup, New Zealand's premier knock-out tournaments with their best run being 2003 and 2014 Chatham Cup where they made the quarter-finals.

Notable former players include Liberato Cacace and Mario Barcia.

Honours
Central League Premier 1999, 2010
Central League Division 1 1995, 1997
Central League Division 2 1983
Central League Division 3 1998
Hilton Petone Cup 1998
Venus Shield 1996
Central League Division 3 Sth 1982
Wellington Division 2 1936, 1980
Wellington Division 3 1974
Wellington Division 1B 1948

References

External links 
 

Association football clubs in Wellington
Sport in Wellington City
Association football clubs established in 1931
1931 establishments in New Zealand